Planorbella magnifica, the magnificent ramshorn, is a species of small, freshwater, air-breathing snail, a pulmonate gastropod mollusc in the family Planorbidae, the ram's horn snails. This species is endemic to the United States.

References

Molluscs of the United States
magnifica
Gastropods described in 1903
Taxonomy articles created by Polbot
Endemic fauna of North Carolina